The Queen Elizabeth Prize for Engineering, also known as the QEPrize, is a global prize for engineering and innovation. The prize was launched in 2012 by a cross-party group consisting of David Cameron, Nick Clegg, and Ed Miliband, then Prime Minister, Deputy Prime Minister and Leader of the Opposition of the United Kingdom. The £500,000 prize, and 3D printed trophy, are awarded annually in the name of Queen Elizabeth II (the prize was biennial until 2021).

The prize is run by the Queen Elizabeth Prize for Engineering Foundation, a charitable company. The Foundation is chaired by Lord Browne of Madingley, with Sir Paul Nurse, Mala Gaonkar, John Hennessy and Sir Jim McDonald serving as trustees. The QEPrize is funded by donations from the following international companies: BAE Systems, BP, GSK, Hitachi Ltd., Jaguar Land Rover, National Grid, Nissan Motor Corporation, Shell, Siemens UK, Sony, Tata Consultancy Services, Tata Steel and Toshiba.

The Prize 
The Queen Elizabeth Prize for Engineering is awarded for engineering-led advances that are judged to be of tangible and widespread benefit to the public. The foundation invites nominations from the public, engineering and science academies, universities, research organisations, and commercial organisations from anywhere in the world; self-nomination is not permitted, and the prize is not awarded posthumously.

The judging panel works from the information provided in the nomination, comments from referees and any additional information required in order to establish which nomination most fully meets the following prize criteria:

 What is it that this person has done (or up to five people have done) that is a ground-breaking innovation in engineering?
 In what way has this innovation been of global benefit to humanity?
 Is there anyone else who might claim to have had a pivotal role in this development?

The winner(s) of the QEPrize are announced every year by the Chairman of the QEPrize Foundation. In the first four prize cycles, this announcement was held at the Royal Academy of Engineering and was attended by members of the British Royal Family. The QEPrize award ceremony takes place in the same year as the announcement. The QEPrize trophy is designed by the winner of the Create the Trophy competition, presented to the winner(s) by a member of the Royal Family. In the first two prize cycles, the trophy was presented by the Queen. In subsequent cycles, the trophy has been presented by the Prince of Wales.

Winners

Judging Panel 
In 2022, the judges for the Queen Elizabeth Prize for Engineering were: Professor Jim Al-Khalili, Dr John Anderson, Professor Brito Cruz, Dr Jean-Lou Chameau, Josephine Cheng, Abdigani Diriye, Alan Finkel, Professor Jinghai Li, Ilya Espino de Marotta, Raghunath Anant Mashelkar, Professor Tatsuya Okubo, Professor Viola Vogel, Paul Westbury, and Henry T. Yang.

The Chair of Judges include: Lord Alec Broers (2013–2015), Sir Christopher Snowden (2015–2021) and Professor Dame Lynn Gladden (2022–present).

QEPrize Ambassador Network 
The QEPrize Ambassador Network is an international network that brings together the best and brightest early-career engineers from all fields around the world, who work to inspire the next generation to take up the challenges of the future. QEPrize ambassadors act as evangelists for engineering, engaging with teachers, parents, school children, politicians, and journalists about their work and why engineering is such an important profession. The Ambassador Network became a global community in 2016.

Create the Trophy competition 
The QEPrize trophy is designed by the winner of the Create the Trophy competition which, like the prize itself, runs annually. The competition is open to those aged between 14 and 24, and is intended to encourage young people to develop 3D design skills. Entries are submitted online through an app.

Winners 

2013: Jennifer Leggett, 17. Leggett was invited to spend the day with designer Thomas Heatherwick before the design was finalised.

2015: Euan Fairholm, 20, a mechanical engineering student at The University of Glasgow. His design, "The Golden Crown", was developed into a final form by BAE Systems and presented to Dr Robert Langer, the winner of the 2015 QEPrize.

2017: Samuel Bentley, 15, from Wales. His design was 3D printed by BAE Systems, and presented to the 2017 QEPrize winners at Buckingham Palace.

2019: Jack Jiang, 16, from Hong Kong.

2021: Hannah Goldsmith, 20, from the United Kingdom.

2022: Anshika Agarwal, 17, from India.

See also

 List of engineering awards

References

External links
 

Awards established in 2012
International awards
2011 establishments in the United Kingdom
Elizabeth II
Engineering awards